Henry Carl Gastright (March 29, 1865 – October 9, 1937) was a 19th-century professional baseball pitcher. He first played Major League Baseball in the American Association, for the Columbus Solons (1889–91), then moved to the National League. He was with the Washington Senators (1892), Pittsburgh Pirates (1893), Boston Beaneaters (1893), Brooklyn Grooms (1894), and Cincinnati Reds (1896).

Gastright's best season was 1890 when he won 30, lost 14, and had a 2.94 earned run average for Columbus. His ERA was seventh best in the American Association, his 30 wins were third best, and his four shutouts placed him second. On October 12, he pitched an 8-inning no-hitter against the Toledo Maumees, winning 6–0.

Another notable season for Gastright was 1893, when his combined mark of 15–5 while pitching for Pittsburgh and Boston gave him a winning percentage of .750, best in the National League.

Career totals for 173 games played (171 as a pitcher) include a 72–63 record, 142 games started, 121 complete games, 6 shutouts, 27 games finished, and 2 saves. His lifetime ERA was 4.20. At the plate he was 101-for-544 (.186) with 56 runs batted in and 52 runs scored.

Gastright died at the age of 72 in Cold Spring, Kentucky.

External links

Retrosheet

1865 births
1937 deaths
19th-century baseball players
Major League Baseball pitchers
Baseball players from Kentucky
Sportspeople from Covington, Kentucky
Columbus Solons players
Washington Senators (1891–1899) players
Pittsburgh Pirates players
Boston Beaneaters players
Brooklyn Grooms players
Cincinnati Reds players
Hartford Bluebirds players
Toledo Maumees (minor league) players